Abdellatif Jouahri (born June 10, 1939) is a Moroccan banker and politician, governor of the Central Bank of Morocco.

Biography 
After studying at the Faculty of Law and Economic Sciences in Rabat, Abdella- tif Jouahri held several managerial positions:

 Minister Delegate to the Prime Minister responsible for the reform of public enterprises (1978)
 Minister of Finance (1981-1986)
 Chairman and CEO of BMCE and Chairman of GPBM (1986-1995)
 Chief Executive Officer of CIMR (2002-2003)
 Governor of Bank Al-Maghrib (since 2003)

In 2017, he appeared in the list of the best governors of a central bank in the world, published by the magazine Global Finance, with those of Australia, Jordan, Honduras, Israel, Lebanon, Paraguay, Russia, Taiwan and the United States.

See also 

 Moroccan dirham
 Economy of Morocco
 List of central banks of Africa

References

External links

1939 births
Finance ministers of Morocco
Living people
Moroccan politicians
Moroccan bankers
Central bankers